Gad Horowitz (born 1936) is a Canadian political scientist. He is a professor emeritus at the University of Toronto.

Biography
Horowitz was born in Jerusalem in 1936 and immigrated to Canada  at the age of 2. His father Rabbi Aaron Horowitz, was a prominent member of the Jewish community and a key figure in founding Camp Massad in Canada. He grew up in Calgary, Winnipeg, and Montreal.

Horowitz earned his Bachelor of Arts degree from United College. He earned his Master of Arts degree from McGill University in 1959, writing his thesis on Mosca and Mills: Ruling Class and Power Elite. He earned his Doctor of Philosophy degree from Harvard University in 1965, writing his thesis on Canadian  in Politics: The Trade Unions and the CCF-NDP, 1937–62, with Sam Beer as his advisor.

Horowitz has specialized in labour theory, and most notably coined the appellation Red Tory in his application of Louis Hartz's fragment theory to Canadian political culture and ideological development, in his essay "Conservatism, Liberalism and Socialism in Canada: An Interpretation" (in the Canadian Journal of Political Science, 32, 2 (1966): 143–71). The use of this appellation differentiates traditional Canadian Toryism from the powerful classical liberal elements that began to emerge in the Conservative Party after the Second World War, but it has applications to conservative parties in other countries where "Tory" acceptance of state enterprises, the welfare state, and other institutions seen as expressions of national character conflicts with "liberal" or "neoliberal" rejection of state intervention in the economy.

Horowitz was a member of the editorial board of Canadian Dimension in its early days, and a frequent contributor to that magazine.

Horowitz teaches a class at the University of Toronto entitled The Spirit of Democratic Citizenship which revolves around general semantics, a non-Aristotelian educational discipline first theorized by Polish engineer Alfred Korzybski. A 21-part video series called 'Radical General Semantics' has been made of his lectures.

Selected bibliography

 (with Asher Horowitz)

Articles

References

Citations

Works cited

External links

1936 births
20th-century Canadian male writers
20th-century Canadian writers
20th-century scholars
Canadian political scientists
Canadian political philosophers
Harvard University alumni
Jewish Canadian writers
Jews in Mandatory Palestine
Living people
Mandatory Palestine emigrants to Canada
McGill University alumni
People from Jerusalem
University of Manitoba alumni
Academic staff of the University of Toronto
Writers from Toronto
Jews from Quebec
Canadian people of Palestinian-Jewish descent